Dr. Claude Nigel Byam Davies (2 September 1920 – 25 September 2004) was a British anthropologist and historian who specialised in the study of the cultures of pre-Columbian America, publishing 12 academic works on the Aztec, Inca and Toltec societies. In addition to his academic work, Davies also served with the Grenadier Guards during the Second World War, briefly sat as an MP for Epping and as the managing director of Windowlite Ltd.

Life
Born in September 1920 to Claude and Nellie Davies, Nigel was educated at Eton College and subsequently at the University of Provence and briefly at the University of Potsdam in Berlin before the outbreak of the Second World War. In 1939 Davies attended the Royal Military College, Sandhurst and graduated the following year, taking a commission as a lieutenant in the Grenadier Guards. During the war, Davies served in the Middle East, Italy and the Balkans, leaving the services after the end of the war in 1946. In the general election of 1950, Davies stood for and won the seat of Epping as a Member of Parliament for the Conservative Party. A year later he gave up the seat, refusing to stand in the general election of 1951 at which the constituency was won by Conservative candidate Graeme Bell Finlay.

Davies subsequently entered academia, achieving a ph.D. in archaeology and studying at University College London and the Universidad Nacional Autónoma de México.  He made a lifelong study of the ancient civilisations of the Americas, concurrently with his role as the managing director of Windowlite Ltd. Among Davies works are books on the Aztec civilisation, the Incas of South America and in particular the Toltecs, the pre-Aztec people of Central Mexico. His works were well received and are now standard references. Davies never married and later retired to live in Tijuana, dying in September 2004.

Works
Los Señoríos Independientes del Imperio Azteca, 1968
Los Mexicas: primeros pasos hacia el imperio, 1973
The Aztecs, 1973
The Toltecs, 1976
Before Columbus Came, 1976Voyagers to the New World, fact and fantasy, 1979The Toltec Heritage, 1980Human Sacrifice, 1981The Ancient Kingdoms of Mexico, 1983The Rampant God, 1984The Aztec Empire, 1987The Incas, 1995The Ancient Kingdoms of Peru'', 1997

Notes

1920 births
2004 deaths
Historians of Peru
People educated at Eton College
British anthropologists
British historians
British Mesoamericanists
Aztec scholars
Graduates of the Royal Military College, Sandhurst
Grenadier Guards officers
British Army personnel of World War II
Alumni of University College London
National Autonomous University of Mexico alumni
Conservative Party (UK) MPs for English constituencies
UK MPs 1950–1951
20th-century Mesoamericanists
Historians of Mesoamerica
University of Provence alumni
20th-century anthropologists